Villa Inferno is the fifth album by Italian band Zen Circus released in 2008 by Unhip Records. Villa Inferno was created in collaboration with Brian Ritchie of the American band Violent Femmes.

Track listing
Dead Penfriend - 2:41
Wild Wild Life (Talking Heads cover) - 3:17
Beat the Drum - 3:43
Punk Lullaby - 2:30
Dirty Feet - 2:20
Figlio di puttana - 4:02
Like a Girl Never Would - 4:41
Narodna Pjesma - 1:59
He Was Robert Zimmerman - 4:00
Vana gloria - 3:37
Oh, the River! - 3:55
Vent'anni - 1:55
Les tantes de la dimanche - 5:58

References

Zen Circus albums
2008 albums